The 2020–21 Rhode Island Rams basketball team represented the University of Rhode Island during the 2020–21 NCAA Division I men's basketball season. The Rams, led by third-year head coach David Cox, played their home games at the Ryan Center in Kingston, Rhode Island as members of the Atlantic 10 Conference. They finished the season 10-15, 7-10 in A-10 play to finish in 10th place. They lost in the second round of the A-10 tournament to Dayton.

Previous season 

The Rams finished the 2019–20 season 21–9, 13–5 in A-10 play to finish in third place. They were to play the winner of Duquesne and Fordham in the quarterfinals of the 2020 Atlantic 10 men's basketball tournament, but the tournament was cancelled due to the COVID-19 pandemic prior to Rhode Island playing a game. The remainder of the season was cancelled due to the pandemic.

Offseason

Departures

Incoming transfers

2020 recruiting class

2021 recruiting class

Roster

Depth chart

Schedule 

|-
!colspan=12 style=| Non-conference regular season
|-

|-
!colspan=12 style=| Atlantic 10 regular season
|-

|-
!colspan=12 style=| A-10 tournament

References

External links 
 Rhode Island Men's Basketball

Rhode Island Rams men's basketball seasons
Rhode Island
Rhode Island
Rhode Island